Les 2 Alpes  is a ski resort in the French department of Isère, Auvergne-Rhône-Alpes. It has the largest skiable glacier in Europe and is France's second oldest ski resort behind Chamonix. It has the longest, normally open full on-piste vertical available in the world. It is a  drive southeast of Grenoble.

Resort
The "two Alps" in the name do not refer to the two facing mountain-sides that comprise the resort, but rather to two adjacent areas of the original mountain pasture on the north-south plateau on which the resort was built. These pasture areas (or 'alps') are part of the two villages of Mont-de-Lans and Vénosc that lie in the deep valleys, respectively, to the north and south.

Access to the resort is by road RD 1091, in Livet-et-Gavet - no road connects the resort to Vénosc down the steep slope to the south, but a gondola connects the two, and there is a footpath passable in summer.

Winter
In terms of pistes the resort has been termed "upside-down", as the lower slopes down to the resort are steeper and more challenging than the higher ski areas, including the wide and forgiving glacier runs. Less advanced skiers either take a gondola down to the resort or follow a lengthy, gentle but narrow, track on the path of the access road. In winter 2015/2016 a new run made an intermediate route to the resort available, an effort involving the movement of over 550,000 cubic meters of earth. A wide area at the very bottom by the town is given over to nursery slopes. In total there are 100 marked runs spread across the resort however, in addition, it is said to have as much off piste as groomed piste.

Les Deux Alpes also boasts one of the most extensive and revered snowparks in Europe, with a halfpipe, multiple kickers, two boardercross courses and many grinding rails. The snowpark is re-modelled with new features added each season.

Lifts
The lift system has a combined up hill capacity of 66,000 people per hour. In total there are 59 lifts serving the resort. At peak times lift queues can be very long, and it can take over an hour to travel from the village to the top of the glacier, which is sometimes closed due to blizzards, high winds, avalanche risks, or a combination of both.

The resort of La Grave can be accessed from the very top lift at the Dome de la Lauze by either walking or at certain times by ski-tow behind a Snowcat. It is only recommended for advanced skiers under supervision of a qualified guide.

As part of the planned 350M Euro investment in Alpe d'Huez over the next 5 years, a new lift connecting the two resorts is targeted for completion on 2021, creating one of the biggest linked ski areas in the world.

Ticketing
A part of the Grande Galaxie area of un-linked ski resorts including Alpe d'Huez, La Grave, Puy Saint Vincent and Vaujany which offer limited sharing of ski-passes. A six-day ski pass includes two days in Alpe d'Huez and one in Serre Chevalier. Ski passes in the resort can now be used hands free.

Glacier
The glacier enables year-round skiing (although the lifts are only open from mid-June to the end of August in Summer and December to end of April in Winter with some dates in October too).

Summer
In summer, Les 2 Alpes becomes a popular venue for downhill and freeride mountain biking, with access to the glacier via the Jandri Express gondola lift, with a yearly event named "Mountain Of Hell". This opens up a vertical mile of trails down to the resort and an even bigger drop to the Barrage du Chambon. Les 2 Alpes has featured in several Tour De France stages most notably a Marco Pantani stage victory in 1998, from which he went on to win the tour that year. Some mountain bikers take the 15 km unpaved road, which leads from Les Deux Alpes all the way up to the ski resort, thereby being the highest mountain road in the Alps. The altitude difference of 1550 m, several very steep passages, as well as the coarse gravel on the road make this a very demanding trip. 

Les 2 Alpes also has the largest skiable glacier in Europe. The  summer ski area is open between June and September.

References

External links

  - les2alpes.com - 
 2alpes.com - 
 Cycling up to Les deux Alpes: data, profile, map, photos and description

Ski stations in France
Tourist attractions in Isère